Sunfire is a series of young adult historical romance novels published by Scholastic Books in the 1980s.  They are currently out of print.

Background
The books were written by a group of authors, including Vivian Schurfranz (9), Jane Claypool Miner (6), Candice F. Ransom (6), Mary Francis Shura (6), Jeffie Ross Gordon (2), and Willo Davis Roberts (3).

Structure of the novels
The Sunfire books contained two themes:  history and romance.  Each book featured a teenage girl who experienced a particular period or event in American history.  At the same time, with very few exceptions, the girl was torn between two potential lovers.  The girl was typically ahead of her time in ideas and actions and the suitor she almost always chose was the one who approved of or accepted her actions. The cover art always featured the main character flanked by her two potential lovers, along with scenes from the historical event or period that was the setting for the book.

Titles and summaries
Titles in the Sunfire series listed in order of publication: (Descriptions taken from the back covers of the books)

(#1) Amanda by Candice F. Ransom  
A new land, a new love

With only a silk dress to protect her from the blazing frontier sun, Amanda fears she will die on the Oregon Trail. As the memories of Boston, the nightly balls, and Joseph fade, the hardships of life on the wagon train fill her days. Changing from a spoiled city girl to a strong young woman, Amanda finds drought and death, beauty and joy, and a love that will last forever.

Set on the Oregon Trail.

(#2) Susannah by Candice F. Ransom    
The South that raised her was at war, while Susannah's own battle raged in her heart...

Susannah Dellinger had lived her sixteen years as a proper Virginia girl – obedient, dreaming of marriage, leaving the decisions to the men. But when her brother and fiancé are called on to defend the South, Susannah take the first daring steps of rebellion against the old rules. She must fight for her own life, for her family, and for the secret love born in the flames of war.

Set during the American Civil War.

(#3) Elizabeth by Willo Davis Roberts  
Did she dare follow her heart?

When someone points an accusing finger and cries "Witch!" Elizabeth faces a choice - between a lie that could doom a friend, and the truth that would threaten her own life. The truth could also ruin wealthy Troy's love for Elizabeth, and reveal her own attraction to a stranger - a wild and rootless boy who shares her fear and courage.

Set during the Salem Witch Trials.

(#4) Danielle by Vivian Schurfranz 
Twice she'd lost her heart, but who was her life-long love?

It is 1814 when New Orleans beauty Danielle Verlain helps Geoffrey, a young pirate, escape from her family's plantation and the authorities. Immediately she is captivated by his dashing good looks and dangerous lifestyle. While her fiancé, Paul, is both handsome and sweet, Danielle yearns for something more. Her change comes when the pirates kidnap her and hold her for ransom. Danielle comes face to face with Geoffrey again. A love stirs inside her, and the spirited Danielle must decide between a comfortable life with Paul or an adventure as a pirate queen!

Set during the War of 1812 and featuring an appearance by infamous pirate Jean Lafitte.

(#5) Joanna by Jane Claypool Miner   
Would she have to defy everything - even love?

From her simple farm life in Vermont, Joanna bravely joins the growing number of girls working in the textile mills in 1836. With her she carries the painful memory of Jed, a young man who has left her, loving the sea more than her loves her.In the Lowell, Massachusetts mill Joanna is horrified to find the work both grueling and dangerous. Even a romance with the mill owner's roguish nephew, Theo, can’t keep the daily work from becoming terrifying drudgery. To strike with the other mill women seems Joanna's only way out of a job that threatens her very existence. But defying the mill owners will certainly mean losing her job and Theo. And if Jed ever returns from the sea, will he recognize – could he love – the new Joanna?

Set in the Lowell, Massachusetts textile mills.

(#6) Jessica by Mary Francis Shura    
One man would love her, one man would lose her.

Jessica had lived all her life on the flat Kansas prairie. It was there, the year she turned sixteen, that Jessica fell in love. The young Indian brave, Wheeling Hawk, saved her from a flood, and Jessica's heart was lost. But even the most spirited young woman would have to defy her family and home for so distant a love. And Jessica couldn’t see in Will Reynold's eyes, where once there was anger, there now shone a love of his own.

Set in 1873 Kansas.

(#7) Caroline by Willo Davis Roberts    
If only men and boys were going to California, then Caroline would become - a boy.

Caroline just wants the same adventures her brothers have. But they're headed West to California to find gold, and that's no place for a girl to be.
So Caroline takes matters - and scissors - into her own hands. By cutting her hair and donning the clothes of a gold-hungry boy, Caroline goes West. One of the young men travelling with her is handsome Dan Riddle, who treats her the way he would any young boy. But underneath the clothes of the boy pounds the heart of a young woman, and while Caroline thinks her quest is for adventure, she finds that it is for love.

Set during the California Gold Rush.

(#8) Kathleen by Candice F. Ransom   
There were times she wished she'd never come to America

Pretty, spirited Kathleen O'Connor arrives in Boston on a "coffin" ship from Ireland. She has escaped the devastating famine, but her boyfriend died at home and her parents did not survive the voyage to America. Still the promise of a new life gives her hope. Patrick, a friend from the ship, finds a job for her as a maid with the wealthy Thornley family.  They remind Kathleen of the landowners in Ireland who forced them from her home. She wants to despise them, but she cannot hate David Thornley, who is tender and handsome, and obviously attracted to her. Her secret love for David could force Kathleen to go back to Ireland or make her dreams for a new life in America come true.

Set during the Great Famine and Irish immigration to the USA.

(#9) Marilee by Mary Francis Shura  
From the calm of England to the wilds of the new colony, Marilee is torn between three loves...

Until her father dies, Marilee lives a peaceful life in England. Suddenly she must cross the ocean to Jamestown, Virginia, to join her brother and his new wife. She is little prepared for the jealous resentment of her sister-in-law, the constant threat of Indian attacks, or so many suitors. Ship's officer Phillip Soames is kind and attentive but often at sea. Michael Braden is dashing but mysterious; and Timothy Reeves, indentured servant to her brother, is insolent but charming. Thrust on her own in this forbidding land, Marilee must follow her heart to find the one she truly loves.

Set in the Jamestown Colony.

(#10) Laura by Vivian Schurfranz  
Would she abandon her beliefs for love?

While men are fighting oversears in World War I, lovely Laura Mitchell is caught up in the struggle for women's rights in the Washington, D.C. of 1918. Dismayed by her willingness to go to jail for her beliefs, Laura's mother and sister encourage her to pay more attention to her suitors. Laura only has eyes for her neighbor, Joe Menotti, who treats her like a kid sister. But her brother's friend, Shawn O’Brien, sweeps her off her feet with his Irish charm and dashing good looks. Yet everyone but Joe wants her to give up her ideals. Should she change herself, try to change the man she loves, or follow her conscience to the man who is waiting with open arms?

Set during World War I, the suffrage movement, and the 1918 influenza pandemic.

(#11) Emily by Candice F. Ransom  
She could have anything in the world she wanted - but the one she loved

At the turn of the 20th century, Emily Blackburn is a wealthy New York society girl who has everything a girl could dream of. She wears the latest Parisian fashions, and is escorted to parties by the adoring and rich Worthington Bates. But amid the social whirl she feels empty and restless. When she meets the handsome Dr. Stephen Reed, she defies her parents and volunteers at the public hospital where he works. Helping there fills her life with new meaning, and Stephen stirs her heart with love. But he only sees her as a spoiled rich girl. Emily must prove that she isn’t useless and cares about others, most of all, about him.

Set in high society in the Gilded Age.

(#12) Jacquelyn by Jeffie Ross Gordon  
How can she think only of herself in these hard times?

Living in Chicago in the 1930s, during the Great Depression, Jacquelyn Penelope Carleton sees poverty and suffering everywhere. But as the daughter of one of the richest families in the city, she never expects to experience it herself. Then her father loses his fortune in the crash and suffers a debilitating stroke. Suddenly Jacky must support her entire family, and she has never worked a day in her life!
Kind, handsome Stefan offers her marriage as an escape from her problems, and David opens her eyes to the dazzling, turbulent world of show business. She must choose between the two men, but doing so will tear her heart in two. Should she choose the comfort of safety or risk everything for excitement?

Set during the Great Depression.

(#13) Victoria by Willo Davis Roberts  
A dashing Texan or a proud Mexican. Which man would win her love?

To beautiful, lovely Victoria Winters, Texas in 1835 is a place where parties last for three days. It's also a place of turmoil and violence. A war with Mexico can’t be far off. Luis Arista, the son of a wealthy Mexican landowner, offers Victoria security and comfort, but would she ever be able to adjust to his way of life? Cade Riley is a ruggedly handsome Texas Ranger who loves Victoria. But he can’t marry her until – or if – he returns from the battlefields. What will become of Victoria's Texas and the men she loves? 

Set during the Texas Revolution.

(#14) Cassie by Vivian Schurfranz  
Her brave heart is torn between two worlds.

Ever since Cassie was captured by the Indians at the age of 4 she has loved her Iroquois family. At 15 she can shoot and ride as well as any warrior. Then her world is destroyed and she is driven from the only home she knows and she must search to find where she truly belongs.

Set in the Iroquois Confederacy during the French and Indian War.

(#15) Roxanne by Jane Claypool Miner  
Theirs would be the greatest love story Hollywood had ever known.

Roxanne has come from a small town to Hollywood with one dream: to become a star. And she will do anything to succeed: change her looks, her name, and her friends.
She has to decide if she should succumb to John Randolph, the movie producer's son, who can introduce her to all the right people. Or if she should follow her heart to Gary Marlowe, a glittering star who has eyes for all of the beautiful bit players and extras on set. But Roxanne knows she is not going to settle for being just another extra – to Gary or Hollywood…she's going to have it all!

Set during the Golden Age of Hollywood.

(#16) Megan by Vivian Schurfranz  
One man will win her; one man will become her enemy.

It's 1867 and beautiful, 16-year-old Megan O’Brien gives up a life of luxury in Washington, D.C. for the hardships of Alaska. Her father's job in international affairs has brought the family to Sitka. As if the harsh climate wasn’t enough to get used to, Megan must also face hostility and threats from angry fur traders who don’t like her father's new rules. She meets handsome Ivan Zolotov, a hardworking fisherman, and dashing Adam Logan, whose father owns Sitka's largest store. When both men fall in love with Megan, she is torn between them. The Zolotovs and the Logans are embroiled in a bitter feud, and she must take a side. Before she is sure which man she will choose, she is kidnapped by vengeful traders. Alone and frightened, she realizes who her true love is. Will she ever have a chance to claim his love?

Set during the Alaska Purchase.

(#17) Sabrina by Candice F. Ransom  
Her country asks her to risk her life. Can she find the courage to do it?

In 1780, the Revolutionary War still rages violently, especially in Charleston, South Carolina, where orphaned, 16-year-old Sabrina Robbins lives and works in her uncle's shop. Sabrina, a staunch Patriot, is in love with Martin Cresswell, a handsome Tory. Even though they are on opposite sides politically, Sabrina believes their love can survive. But when she meets Richard Taylor, a brave but arrogant patriot who is a spy, she is confused. How can she be so attracted to Richard if she loves Martin?
When Sabrina's uncle becomes ill, Sabrina has to take over his role in the spy ring, even though doing so means betraying Martin and risking her own life. She knows that Richard things some things – freedom and love – are worth any risks. But will she find the courage to fight for freedom and choose between the two men who love her?

Set during the American Revolutionary War.

(#18) Veronica by Jane Claypool Miner  
Her heart is filled with love for a man she may never see again.

To 16-year-old Veronica Stewart, Pearl Harbor, Hawaii, in 1941 is a tropical paradise. Pretty and popular, her biggest worry is how to tell her longtime boyfriend, Mike, that she'd like to date other boys - especially Phillip, a handsome sailor stationed at the base.
But December 7, 1941, the day the Japanese bomb Pearl Harbor and American enters World War II, changes everything. Both Phillip and Mike are called to duty and both realize they are in love with Veronica. She is terrified for their safety but keeps busy working as a hospital volunteer. Veronica faces hardship and danger, but the work helps her grow into a woman and to realize which man she truly loves. Will he come back to Hawaii to claim Veronica's heart?

Set during the Attack on Pearl Harbor and World War II.

(#19) Nicole by Candice F. Ransom  
Can the love in her heart give her the courage to face incredible danger?

World-travelling Nicole Sanders, a wealthy 16-year-old, has always lived in luxury. In 1912, she and her mother are returning to American on the Titanic - the first unsinkable ocean liner!
Aboard ship, two men fall in love with Nicole - Price, a rich Englishman and Karl, a handsome immigrant. Before she can choose between them, tragedy interrupts Nicole's happiness. The Titanic is sinking! Nicole can't find Karl or Price in the terrible confusion and she knows there aren't enough lifeboats for everyone. Even if she reaches safety, can she dare to hope the men she loves will, too?

Set during the Sinking of the RMS Titanic.

(#20) Julie by Vivian Schurfranz  
Still only a girl, love forces her to make a woman's choice.

It's 1868 and in Crooked Branch, Utah, 15-year-old Julie Fulton is proud her family is helping build the first transcontinental railroad. With her father an engineer, and her mother head telegrapher for the railroad project, pretty, energetic Julie also wants to make a contribution. Her wish comes true when she begins to work as a telegrapher, too. For Julie, this down of a new era in her life is truly thrilling!
Even more thrilling is the way Julie feels when she meets two men who work on the railroad: Dylan O'Kelly, a dashing Irish charmer; and handsome, serious Samuel Harper. Dylan wants Julie to travel West with him to help complete the railroad. Samuel wants to take her to the glamour of Washington, D.C.
Both men offer Julie all the excitement and love she could ever want. But will her heart be wise enough to choose the man she really loves?

Set during the building of the transcontinental railroad, including the "Last Spike" ceremony.

(#21) Rachel by Vivian Schurfranz   
Can she be true to her heritage and to the boy she loves?

It is 1910 and 16-year-old Rachel Roth and her family are immigrants from Poland to America. When Rachel sees the Statue of Liberty in New York Harbor, she catches her breath. The magnificent statue seems to promise her a better life.
While life in bustling New York City turns out to be hard, Rachel is happy with her new country and her job at the Triangle Shirtwaist Factory. Unaware that a tragedy in the factory is about to happen, Rachel thrives on the admiration of handsome Joshua Fine, who wants a traditional home with her by his side. But when Rachel meets Nathan Meyers, an energetic reporter who loves her and wants her to be as modern, as American, as he is, Rachel is uncertain. To be American, must she give up her past? Will her heritage, or her heart, determine which boy she loves?

Set during the Central European migration to the USA and includes the Triangle Shirtwaist Factory fire.

(#22) Corey by Jane Claypool Miner   
She escaped from the South to the North, where a boy captured her heart.

In  1864, 16-year-old Corey has only known slavery. But she is courageous and spirited, and though Ned, a handsome slave from the same South Carolina plantation, hopes to marry her someday, Corey longs for a better life. Then the Civil War tears Corey's family apart, but Corey escapes from slavery.
Freedom isn't easy, however. Corey can't find her family, and Ned tells her he is running off to fight. Corey has no one left she can trust, so she heads north to Philadelphia. Here she finds a new home and new friends. And she meets Penn Wilson, a dashing young man who captures her heart and introduces her to a new, free world. But when Ned asks Corey to go West with him, the choices freedom brings seem harder than ever. Will Corey join Ned? Or will she return to the South to help her people - alongside Penn?

Set during the American Civil War.

(#23) Heather by Vivian Schurfranz  
Two men love her - but one of them might be plotting to kill her.

Formal balls and hired thugs, excitement and danger and love are all part of life in New York in 1665. And 16-year-old Heather Lawson is part of it, too. She and her father have settled on Willow Acres, a land grant along the Hudson River from King Charles of England.
But someone doesn't want them there. Is it their mysterious neighbor, Lord Downing, whose handsome, arrogant son Michael is painting Heather's portrait? Is it laughing, blond Jan Van Ryswyk, a Dutch riverboatman who says he loves Heather and wants to marry her?
On the night Lord Downing holds a formal ball, Willow Acres' crops are destroyed by fire. All the evidence seems to point to Jan and the Dutch, but Heather is not so sure. If she is wrong, it could cost her the one she loves. If she is right, it could cost her her life!

Set during the beginning of New York City.

(#24) Gabrielle by Mary Francis Shura   
She's a showboat star. Will she have to give it up for love?

Sixteen-year-old Gabrielle Prentice is practicing a new tightrope act for her father's showboat on the banks of the Mississippi River when she falls into the arms of a handsome young farmer - and in love.
She soon finds that being in love with David Wesley isn't easy. Mrs. Wesley, his mother, looks down on showboat people, and showboat people, especially the talented, aloof Stephen Dubois, do not think much of farmers. But Gabrielle is determined to pursue her dream of life on land. She convinces her father to let her accept the invitation grudgingly extended by Mrs. Wesley to spend a week on the family farm.
Life on the farm is not what Gabrielle had imagined. David is different, too. Has Gabrielle been dreaming of the wrong love? And is she ready to face what she really wants?

Set in 1880 on a Mississippi showboat.

(#25) Merrie by Vivian Schurfranz  
It will take everything she has to survive the first year at Plymouth Colony

Stowing away aboard the Mayflower to escape an arranged marriage, sixteen-year-old Merrie Courtland receives no welcome on the Pilgrim ship. Luke Bosworth, the dashing young sailor who finds her, believes she is nothing but a dishonest stowaway. Her sole friend is the doctor's handsome young assistant, Zachariah Gaines.
Merrie must be brave and resourceful to make it through the harsh, lonely first winter at Plymouth Colony. But can she persuade the Pilgrims to accept her?
Luke wants Merrie to return to England to marry him. Zachariah wants her to stay. As the colony prepares a feast of thanksgiving, Merrie faces the hardest test of all. Does she have the courage to listen to her heart?

Set in the Plymouth Colony.

(#26) Nora by Jeffie Ross Gordon  
It's as easy to fall in love with a rich man as a poor man. Isn't it?

Nora has always been poor. But her job as a companion to a rich San Francisco lady has given her a glimpse of a glittering, secure world. She is determined to be a part of it, determined to convince her beau Jamie to give up his dangerous dream of being an aviator for a respectable career in the bank where he works.
Then the great San Francisco earthquake of 1906 reduced the once elegant city to rubble. And Nora rescues a handsome stranger. Is she falling in love with this man who has lost his memory - who could be a thief?
Her head tells her one thing, her heart another. The wrong choice could mean the end of all her dreams.

Set during the 1906 San Francisco earthquake.

(#27) Margaret by Jane Claypool Miner  
Can her worst student teach her the most important lesson of all?

Teaching in a one-room prairie schoolhouse in Nebraska in 1886 means more than giving lessons to 32 very different students. For 15-year-old Margaret, who has left Chicago to start a new life, it also means learning to survive savage blizzards, a deadly plague, and awful loneliness.
Then she meets Gerald, the handsome young easterner who is teaching in a nearby town. And she finds herself drawn more and more to brooding, handsome Robert, the 18-year-old farmer's son who is her worst pupil.
Gerald offers Margaret a chance to go back to the civilized comforts of the city. But she can’t forget her dreams. A raging prairie fire forces Margaret to prove herself, and gives her the courage to choose the life – and love – she truly wants.

Set in a midwestern one-room schoolhouse.

(#28) Josie by Vivian Schurfranz  
Can Josie have love and adventure?

Ever since her mother died, Josie has taken care of the family. But she dreams of adventure, and a more exciting beau than kind, gentle James, who runs the Carson City pony express office. Then Mike, a dashing new pony express rider, comes to town. Are Josie's dreams coming true?
Josie find the answer unexpectedly, when she is the only one who can make a daring ride to get the mail through. Captured by a group of outlaws led by a famous woman bandit, Jodie gets a first-hand look at a real life of daring and danger, and some woman-to-woman advice about love.
Does Josie have the heart for another kind of adventure – the adventure of true love?

Set during the 18-month run of the Pony Express.

(#29) Diana by Mary Francis Shura  
It was a time for adventure...and a time for love.

On the eve of the dangerously controversial Louisiana Purchase, Diana meets David, a handsome and charming French Creole aristocrat, at a gala New Orleans party. When her family sends her to St. Louis, until the threat of a Creole uprising against the Purchase is over, David follows Diana.
In St. Louis, Diana meets John, a brave and bold Kentucky frontiersman who is about to leave with the Lewis and Clark Expedition, which is being sent to explore the new territory.
After the expedition departs and months pass without word of it, it is given up for lost. David wants Diana to marry him.
But will saying yes to David be saying no to true love?

Set during the Louisiana Purchase and featuring the Lewis and Clark Expedition.

(#30) Renee by Vivian Schurfranz  
If you dream great dreams, do you give up true love?

More than anything, Renee wants to become a New York City newspaper reporter. Her family doesn’t approve. But Nick, the young man they expect her to marry, understands. Or does he? One day, when handsome Steven Morison walks into her father's bicycle shop, Renee gets her chance. Steven's mother owns the New York Gazette. Steven gets Renee a job as a cub reporter. And he asks her out.
Then the Great Blizzard of 1888 buries New York City with raging, icy winds and huge snowdrifts, some as high as buildings. Renee is the only reporter to make it to work, and she's told to cover the blizzard! Braving the dangerous, freezing streets, she becomes a heroine more than once. And her story is published – on the front page! She's on her way.
Steven has asked her to marry him, and give up her job. She knows she loves him. But does real love mean giving up her dreams?

Set during the Great Blizzard of 1888.

(#31) Jennie by Jane Claypool Miner  
Can any good come of such a disaster?

Swept away in the murderous Johnstown Flood of 1889, 16-year-old Jennie fights death - and wins. Now in the devastating, tragedy-haunted wreckage, she must fight to keep herself and her family alive.
Then, while working as a telegraph operator for the reporters who have poured into the Pennsylvania town to cover the disaster, she meets brash, handsome David. Is she falling in love with him? Or does she really love Jim, who may be one of the people responsible for the flood?
Fighting to rebuild Johnstown, Jennie tries to fight her heart. But this is one battle she may not want to win.

Set during the Johnstown Flood.

(#32) Darcy by Mary Francis Shura  
Has the hurricane swept everything away?

For her sixteenth birthday, Galveston, Texas belle Darcy wants to have fun. She wants to laugh with her best friend Angela, flirt with Angela's handsome, maddening Yankee cousin Michael, and dance with her old friend Alex.
But the Galveston hurricane of September, 1900, changes all that. Caught with Michael in the murderous gale and tides that level Galveston in one night, killing more than 6,000 people, Darcy survives. Now she must face her pain.
She must find the strength to help rebuild the island that was her home, so it can never be destroyed by a hurricane again. But after such losses, will she have the strength to love again?

Set during the 1900 Galveston hurricane.

Chronology of books 
 1620 Merrie (#25)
 1622 Marilee (#9)
 1665 Heather (#23)
 1692 Elizabeth (#3)
 1755 Cassie (#14)
 1780 Sabrina (#17)
 1803 Diana (#29)
 1814 Danielle (#4)
 1835 Victoria (#13)
 1836 Joanna (#5)
 1846 Amanda (#1)
 1847 Kathleen (#8)
 1852 Caroline (#7)
 1861 Josie (#28)
 1864 Corey (#22)
 1864 Susannah (#2)
 1867 Megan (#16)
 1868 Julie (#20)
 1873 Jessica (#6)
 1880 Gabrielle (#24)
 1886 Margaret (#27)
 1888 Renee (#30)
 1889 Jennie (#31)
 1900 Emily (#11)
 1900 Darcy (#32)
 1906 Nora (#26)
 1910 Rachel (#21)
 1912 Nicole (#19)
 1918 Laura (#10)
 1931 Jacquelyn (#12)
 1938 Roxanne (#15)
 1941 Veronica (#18)

American young adult novels
Novel sequences
American romance novels